Manfred Rummel (22 March 1938 – 27 July 2017) was a German professional football player and coach.

Career
Born in Essen, Rummel joined Schwarz-Weiß Essen in 1958 from FSV Kettwig. He was part of the Schwarz-Weiß Essen which won the 1959 German Cup. He spent five years with the club, scoring 51 goals in 87 appearances. He also played for SC Preußen Münster and 1. FC Kaiserslautern. He later played in the United States with the Pittsburgh Phantoms and the Kansas City Spurs.

After retiring as a player, Rummel initially coached football to people with disabilities, before becoming manager of Schwarz-Weiß Essen in 1981, staying in that role until 1983. He held various other roles with the club, including being their managing director from 2006 to 2011. He also worked as the manager of Bayer 04 Leverkusen, and as a coach at Rot-Weiss Essen.

References

1938 births
2017 deaths
German footballers
Association football forwards
Schwarz-Weiß Essen players
SC Preußen Münster players
1. FC Kaiserslautern players
Pittsburgh Phantoms players
Kansas City Spurs players
Bundesliga players
National Professional Soccer League (1967) players
North American Soccer League (1968–1984) players
German football managers
Bayer 04 Leverkusen managers
Schwarz-Weiß Essen managers
German expatriate footballers
Expatriate soccer players in the United States
German expatriate sportspeople in the United States
Footballers from Essen